The Chief Minister of Punjab is the head of the government of Punjab. As per the Constitution of India, the Governor of Punjab is the state's head, but de facto executive authority rests with the chief minister. Following elections to the Punjab Legislative Assembly, the governor usually invites the party (or coalition) with a majority of seats to form the government. The governor appoints the chief minister, whose council of ministers are collectively responsible to the assembly. Given that he has the confidence of the assembly, the chief minister's term is for five years and is subject to no term limits.

History

Punjab Province (1937-1947) 
The province of Punjab was then headquartered in Lahore.Under the Government of India Act 1935, a bicameral legislature was set up with a legislative assembly and a legislative council with a government headed by the Prime Minister. The Unionist Party won the Punjab Provincial Assembly elections, 1937 and Sir Sikandar Hayat Khan became the Premier of Punjab and hold the position up to his death in 1942. Khan was succeeded by Sir Khizar Tiwana.  In 1946 elections were held the Unionist Party stood fourth place but with the support of Indian National Congress and Shiromani Akali Dal formed the government under Sir Khizar Tiwana. Tiwana later resigned on 2 March 1947 against the decision of Partition of India.

Patiala and East Punjab States Union (1948-1956) 
Patiala and East Punjab States Union or PEPSU was an Indian state formed by the union of the post-partition province of Punjab on the Indian side of the border with eight princely states, which were allowed to maintain their native monarchs. The state was inaugurated on 15 July 1948 and formally became a state in 1950. Among these princely states, six were salute states:- Patiala, Jind, Kapurthala, Nabha, Faridkot and Malerkotla. The other two states were Nalagarh and Kalsia. PEPSU was earlier headed by the Premier, from 1952 the Chief Minister become the head of the government. On 1 November 1956, PEPSU was merged mostly into East Punjab( Punjab from 1950) following the States Reorganisation Act, 1956.

East Punjab (1947-1966) 
The state of East Punjab was formed in 1947 later it was renamed Punjab in 1950. It consisted of the parts of the Punjab Province of British India that went to India following the partition of India. Since 1947, Punjab has had fifteen chief ministers. The first was Gopi Chand Bhargava of the Indian National Congress party, who was sworn in on 15 August 1947, when India gained independence from the British. He was succeeded by fellow Congressman Bhim Sen Sachar, who was then subsequently replaced after 188 days by former Chief Minister Gopi Chand Bhargava. After a brief term, President Rajendra Prasad placed the Punjab Legislative Assembly under suspension for ninth months to help the state government gets its act together. In 1952, the first state elections took place for the Legislative Assembly. The results of the election saw the return of the Congress government with former Chief Minister Bhim Sen Sachar as its leader. After he resigned in 1956, Partap Singh Kairon became chief minister. Serving until 1964, Kairon remains one of Punjab's longest-serving chief ministers. He was followed by the returning Chief Minister Gopi Chand Bhargava, who briefly held office as acting chief minister for only 15 days. In July 1964, Ram Kishan assumed the office and served for two years. His tenure was followed by the President's rule which lasted for 119 days. On 1 November 1966, the state of Haryana was partitioned from Punjab and some other districts were given to the state of Himachal Pradesh.

Punjab (Since 1966)
The first chief minister of the newly re-configured state was Giani Gurmukh Singh Musafir who led a Congress government from the Vidhan Parishad, one of only two to have done so. In the 1967 elections, he was voted out of power in favour of the Akali Das Sant Fateh Singh Group whose leader Gurnam Singh became the first non-Congress chief minister. Gurnam Singh's government was succeeded by three short-lived Akali Dal governments—Lachhman Singh Gill's government for less than a year and a little more than a year under the returning Gurnam Singh and Parkash Singh Badal. After 272 days under President's rule, the Congress party returned to power under the future President Zail Singh. In 1977, Parkash Singh Badal became the chief minister for the second time. Darbara Singh became chief minister in 1980 and remained in office for three years before a long period under President's rule. A brief interlude under Surjit Singh Barnala followed, after which three Congress-led governments took office—led by Beant Singh from 1992 to 1995, Harcharan Singh Brar from 1995 to 1996 and Rajinder Kaur Bhattal from 1996 to 1997. Upon taking office, Rajinder Kaur Bhattal became the first female chief minister of Punjab and overall the 8th female chief minister in India.

Parkash Singh Badal assumed office for the third time in 1997 and became the first chief minister, since Kairon's resignation in 1964, to serve a full term. Badal was succeeded by Congressman Amarinder Singh, who also successfully served a full term. In 2017 he became CM for the second time but failed to complete his tenure due to internal political factionalism and Charanjit Singh Channi became the first Dalit chief minister of Punjab just 6 months before the expiry of the 15th assembly.

Office
The office of the chief minister of Punjab is located at Punjab Civil Secretariat, Sector – 1, Chandigarh.

Key

Colour key for party of the chief minister
 
 
  
 
 
 

Other key
 No.: Incumbent number
  Assassinated 
  Died in Office 
  Position Dissolved

Precursors

Punjab Province (1937-1947)

Patiala and East Punjab States Union (1948-1956)

Chief Minister of Punjab

See also
 List of governors of Punjab (India)
 List of Deputy Chief Ministers of Punjab (India)

Notes

References

External links
 assembly info

Punjab
 
Chief Ministers